The 2015 Sultan of Johor Cup was the fifth edition of the Sultan of Johor Cup. It was held in Johor Bahru, Johor, Malaysia from 11 to 18 October 2015.

The number of teams for this year's cup is the same compared to the previous tournament where six teams competed. New Zealand who competed previously, will not join this edition and Argentina had been invited.

Great Britain defeated India 4–3 in a penalty shootout after being tied 2–2 in the final match to win the cup.

Participating nations
Six countries are participating in this year's tournament:

 (Host)

Results
All times are in Malaysia Standard Time (UTC+08:00).

Pool

Classification

Fifth and sixth place

Third and fourth place

Final

Final standings

References

External links
Official website

Sultan of Johor Cup
Sultan of Johor Cup
Sultan of Johor Cup
Sultan of Johor Cup
Sultan of Johor Cup